Calvin Lewellyn "Cal" Rampton (November 6, 1913September 16, 2007) was an American attorney and politician who served as the 11th governor of the state of Utah from 1965 to 1977.

Early life and education 
He was born to Llewellyn Smith Rampton and Janet Campbell in Bountiful, Utah. Following his graduation from Davis High School in 1931, Rampton took over his family's automobile business, due to his father's death that same year. He sold the business in 1933 and entered the University of Utah, graduating in 1936. He also studied at the George Washington University Law School while working as administrative assistant to Congressman J. W. Robinson.

Career 
Rampton served as Davis County Attorney from 1938 to 1940, the only other public office he would be elected to until becoming governor in 1965.

Rampton served in Europe during World War II as Chief of the Army Claims Commission in Paris; he attained the rank of major and received the Bronze Star Medal. Rampton continued to serve in the Army Reserve and attained the rank of colonel before retiring. After the war he pursued a career as an attorney and his success in civil trial practice earned him a fellowship with the International Academy of Trial Lawyers. He was a Democratic candidate for the Utah State Senate in 1954 and United States Senate in 1962.

He is the only governor of Utah to serve three full consecutive terms, and was one of the most popular governors in the country. During his governorship, he successfully advocated for increased education spending, civil rights legislation, and allocating federal funds for urban renewal. He was a supporter of the Equal Rights Amendment to the U.S. Constitution, and advocated successfully for state construction projects, including Salt Lake City’s Symphony Hall (now Abravanel Hall) and the Salt Lake Arts Center (now Utah Museum of Contemporary Art).

After leaving office, Rampton practiced law until he retired at the age of 75.

Personal life 
Rampton married Lucybeth Cardon (1914–2004) on March 10, 1940; they had four children.

In 2007, Rampton died of cancer in Holladay, Utah. Shortly after his death, the Salt Palace Convention Center in Salt Lake City was also named in his honor. The Calvin L. Rampton Complex in Taylorsville, which houses the Utah Department of Transportation and the Utah Department of Public Safety, is also named in his honor.

In Popular Culture 
In the made-for-television movie The Executioner's Song (film), Rampton is referenced in a recreated radio news clip as having requested the Utah Board of Pardons to review convicted murderer Gary Gilmore's execution just before the end of his final term.  Rampton's successor Scott M. Matheson declined to get involved in the matter, and the execution was soon carried out.

Sources
Cal Rampton: Former three-term governor dies at 93
Utah History Research Center
An Interview with Former Gov. Rampton

References

|-

|-

1913 births
2007 deaths
20th-century American politicians
American businesspeople in retailing
American people of English descent
American people of Manx descent
American people of Scottish descent
Burials at Salt Lake City Cemetery
Deaths from cancer in Utah
Democratic Party governors of Utah
George Washington University Law School alumni
Latter Day Saints from Utah
People from Bountiful, Utah
United States congressional aides
University of Utah alumni